The Valahia University of Târgovişte is a university in Târgoviște, Dâmbovița County, Romania.

Organization
These are the 10 faculties in which the university is divided into:

 Faculty of Economics  
 Faculty of Law and Administrative Sciences
 Faculty of Electrical Engineering, Electronics and Information Technology  
 Faculty of Environmental Engineering and Food Science
 Faculty of Humanities
 Faculty of Orthodox Theology and Educational Science
 Faculty of Materials Engineering and Mechanics
 Faculty of Political Sciences, Letters and Communication
 Faculty of Sciences and Arts
 Faculty of Sciences and Engineering Alexandria

Valahia University of Târgoviște
Universities in Romania
Education in Târgoviște
Buildings and structures in Târgoviște
Educational institutions established in 1992
1992 establishments in Romania